Old Man's Lake is a small lake near Magnetawan, in the Almaguin Highlands, Parry Sound District, Ontario, Canada. It is spring fed and hosts a handful of cottages.  The lake drains over a small waterfall into Ahmic Lake.

Old Man's Lake received its name because, the story goes,  the area once was divided into three large farms.  Two farms were owned by two sons and the “Old Man” had the other.  His house was on the east shore.  The farm still exists today (although it is much smaller).

See also
List of lakes in Ontario

External links
Topo map of the area
Another topo of the area

Lakes of Parry Sound District